First Methodist Church of Greenwood is a historic church at 310 W. Washington Street in Greenwood, Mississippi.

The Romanesque style building was constructed in 1898 and added to the National Register of Historic Places in 1985.

References

Methodist churches in Mississippi
Churches on the National Register of Historic Places in Mississippi
Romanesque Revival church buildings in Mississippi
Churches completed in 1898
1898 establishments in Mississippi
National Register of Historic Places in Leflore County, Mississippi